Opsariichthys kaopingensis is a species of cyprinid fish. The specific name kaopingensis refers to its type locality, Kaoping River.

References

Cyprinidae
Cyprinid fish of Asia
Freshwater fish of Taiwan
Endemic fauna of Taiwan
Taxa named by Chen I-Shiung
Taxa named by Wu Jui-Hsien
Fish described in 2009